The 2010 Monza Formula Two round is the third round of the 2010 FIA Formula Two Championship season. It will be held on May 22, 2010 and May 23, 2010 at the Autodromo Nazionale Monza, Italy.

Classification

Qualifying 1

Qualifying 2

Race 1

Race 2

Standings after the race 
Drivers' Championship standings

References

FIA Formula Two Championship